Monroe Area High School is located in Walton County, Georgia, United States. It serves the city of Monroe.

The school
Monroe Area High School is a public, four-year comprehensive high school for grades nine through twelve.

The present campus was constructed in 2005, and includes a football stadium (the Purple Pit) with a nine-lane rubberized track, baseball and softball fields, tennis courts, and a practice field for football and soccer. The current facility replaced the former campus a few miles away.

The old Monroe Area High School building (currently home to the Walton County satellite campus of Athens Technical College), its football stadium, and the Monroe Area football team were used during filming of the TV series The Vampire Diaries.

Demographics
The demographic breakdown of the 1,102 students enrolled in 2012-2013 was:
Male - 50.0%
Female - 50.0%
Native American/Alaskan - 0.3%
Asian/Pacific Islanders - 3.1%
Black - 32.3%
Hispanic - 4.8%
White - 56.5%
Multiracial - 3.0%

62.1% of the students were eligible for free or reduced lunch.

Sports
Monroe Area is home to the Purple Hurricanes and competes in region 8-AAA of the Georgia High School Association. The school offers the following sports:
Baseball
Basketball (boys' and girls')
Cheerleading
Color guard
Cross country (boys' and girls')
Dance team
Football
Golf (boys' and girls')
Majorettes
Soccer (boys' and girls')
Softball
Swimming (boys' and girls')
Tennis (boys' and girls')
Track and field (boys' and girls')
Volleyball
Wrestling

In 2012 the girls' track team won the State Championship for 8-AAA.

Notable alumni
 Marquis Floyd - former NFL and AFL player
 Michael Gallup - American football player, Dallas Cowboys
 Javianne Oliver - Sprinter, 2021 Tokyo Olympics
 Patricia Roberts, basketball player, coach
 Stephon Tuitt, Former NFL player, Pittsburgh Steelers

References

Educational institutions in the United States with year of establishment missing
Public high schools in Georgia (U.S. state)
Schools in Walton County, Georgia